Lorne Doerkson is a Canadian politician, who was elected to the Legislative Assembly of British Columbia in the 2020 British Columbia general election. He represents the electoral district of Cariboo-Chilcotin as a member of the British Columbia Liberal Party.

Prior to his election to the legislature, Doerkson was a newspaper publisher with Black Press and a financial consultant with Investors Group.

Electoral record

References

21st-century Canadian politicians
British Columbia Liberal Party MLAs
People from the Cariboo Regional District
Living people
Year of birth missing (living people)